Tang Siu-tong, SBS, JP (born 26 September 1942 in Hong Kong), was a member of the Legislative Council of Hong Kong from 1992 to 2004. He is also a registered doctor in Yuen Long, Hong Kong.

Early life
Tang received his MBBS from the University of Adelaide in 1968. In 1974, he received a FRCS from the Royal Society of Edinburgh and his FRCPS from the Royal College of Physicians and Surgeons of Glasgow.  Tang received the FHKAM in Surgery from the Hong Kong Academy of Medicine in 1993.

References

1941 births
Living people
Members of the Regional Council of Hong Kong
Indigenous inhabitants of the New Territories in Hong Kong
Members of the National Committee of the Chinese People's Political Consultative Conference
Hong Kong medical doctors
Members of the Election Committee of Hong Kong, 2007–2012
Democratic Alliance for the Betterment and Progress of Hong Kong politicians
Hong Kong Progressive Alliance politicians
District councillors of Yuen Long District
Members of the Provisional Legislative Council
HK LegCo Members 1991–1995
HK LegCo Members 1998–2000
HK LegCo Members 2000–2004
Members of the Selection Committee of Hong Kong
Recipients of the Silver Bauhinia Star